Noémi Makra (born 18 November 1997) is a Hungarian artistic gymnast. She competed at the 2013 World Artistic Gymnastics Championships, where she finished 14th in the all-around.

Career

2011-2012 
Makra made her international debut at the 2011 European Youth Summer Olympic Festival where she won gold on the uneven bars. At the 2012 Junior European Championships, she placed tenth with her team, ninth in the all-around, and eighth on vault.

2013 
Makra made her senior debut at the 2013 European Championships where she placed eleventh in the all-around. She was the third reserve for the floor final. At the Ljubljana World Cup, she won gold on floor, silver on uneven bars, and silver on beam. She placed fourth on bars at the Anadia World Cup.  At the Osijek World Cup, she finished fourth on beam and floor, fifth on vault, and sixth on bars.

At the 2013 World Championships, Makra finished fourteenth in the all-around. She was the first reserve for the floor final.

2014 
At the Cottbus World Cup, Makra won a bronze on bars, and finished fourth on vault. She also won a gold medal on beam, beating Maria Kharenkova and Andreea Munteanu. At the 2014 Osijek World Cup, she won a silver on uneven bars. Makra finished eighth on vault at the 2014 European Championships. At the end of August, Makra competed at the Hungarian National Championships in Budapest, where she swept the gold medals.

Competitive History

References

1997 births
Living people
Hungarian female artistic gymnasts
Gymnasts at the 2015 European Games
European Games competitors for Hungary
20th-century Hungarian women
21st-century Hungarian women